Dryocoetes is a genus of beetles belonging to the family Curculionidae.

The species of this genus are found in Europe, Japan and Northern America.

Species:
 Dryocoetes abietinus Kono & Tamanuki, 1939
 Dryocoetes abietis Hopkins, 1915b

References

Curculionidae
Curculionidae genera